Henry Carl Lind (September 19, 1903 – August 2, 1946) was an American professional baseball second baseman. He played in Major League Baseball (MLB) from 1927 through 1930 for the Cleveland Indians.

In a four season career, Lind posted a .272 batting average with one home run and 74 RBI in 256 games, including 52 doubles, one triple, 131 runs, and nine stolen bases.

His most productive season came in 1928, when he led the American League in at bats (659) and posted career numbers in average (.294), RBI (54) and doubles (42), ending 15th in MVP voting.

Lind died in New York City, New York, of Metastatic Lymphosarcoma of the stomach, at the age of 42.

References

External links

1903 births
1946 deaths
Baseball players from Louisiana
Cleveland Indians players
Denver Bears players
Houston Buffaloes players
Indianapolis Indians players
Major League Baseball second basemen
New Orleans Pelicans (baseball) players
Newark Bears (IL) players
Oakland Oaks (baseball) players
Peoria Tractors players
Toledo Mud Hens players
Tulane Green Wave men's basketball players